Vicelinus (also Vicelin, ; 1086 – December 12, 1154) was a German bishop of Oldenburg in Holstein who was considered the apostle of Holstein. Also known as – Apostle of Obodriten, of the Wends, Vicelinus, Vincelin, Vizelin, Wissel, Witzel.

Life
Vicelinus was born in Hamelin around 1086.
Orphaned at an early age, he was raised by his uncle Ludolf, a priest in a neighboring village. He left secretly for Paderborn, where he enjoyed the home and instructions of Hartmann, and soon surpassed his companions and assisted in the management of the cathedral school.

Vicelinus was called to Bremen to act as teacher and principal of the school, and was offered a canonry by Archbishop Frederick of the Archbishopric of Hamburg-Bremen. In 1122 he may have gone to Laon to complete his studies under Abelard. In 1126, Vicelinus decided to travel to Madgeburg, in order to see Norbert of Xanten, who at that time was the archbishop.  He hoped that Norbert would ordain him a priest and he could begin missionary work among the Slavs.  For one reason or another this plan failed and so Vicelinus returned to Bremen, where Bishop Albero ordained him. Hamburg-Bremen's Archbishop Adalbero sent him among the Polabian Slavs, and in the fall of 1126 Henry, Prince of the Obotrites, gave him a church in Liubice, near the site of the later Lübeck. At the death of Henry (22 March 1127) Vicelinus returned to Bremen, and was appointed pastor at Wippenthorp. This gave him an opportunity to work among the Wagrians and neighbouring Obotrites.

Vicelinus's preaching gathered crowds of eager listeners, and many priests aided him in founding the new monastery in 1127, which became eponymous for Wippenthorp as Neumünster. This monastery of Canons Regular followed the Rule of St. Augustine, and was liberally endowed by the archbishop. Wars among the tribes in 1137 caused the missionaries to abandon their labours for two years. Vicelinus sent two priests to Liubice, but with little success. In  1134 he founded a second canonry at Segeberg.

Some years later Vicelinus established a house at Hogersdorf. In Harsefeld Hamburg-Bremen's Archbishop Hartwig I made him Bishop of Starigard (or Aldinborg by the Saxons, today's Oldenburg) in 1149. There he did much for the spiritual and temporal welfare of his diocese. In 1152 he was struck by paralysis and lingered amid much suffering for two years before dying in Neumünster.

Veneration
After in 1330 the Augustine canon-law college moved to Bordesholm his body was transferred there too in 1332, and buried before the main altar. In 1874 the small Catholic parish at Hamelin had his picture engraved on a new bell. He is usually represented with a church resting on his left arm; his feast is celebrated on 12 December.

References

External links

 
 
 St Vicelinus (with image) 
 http://www.santiebeati.it/dettaglio/81130

|-

1086 births
1154 deaths
People from Hamelin
German Roman Catholic saints
12th-century German Roman Catholic bishops
12th-century Christian saints
Christians of the Wendish Crusade